Thüringen Rundfahrt der U23 was a bicycle road race held annually in the German state of Thuringia. It was a stage race reserved to athletes under the age of 23. Since 2005, it was organized as a 2.2U event on the UCI Europe Tour. After the 2013 edition, it was discontinued.

Winners

See also
Thüringen Rundfahrt der Frauen

References

External links
Official Website

Cycle races in Germany
UCI Europe Tour races
Recurring sporting events established in 1976
1976 establishments in East Germany
Sport in Thuringia
Under-23 cycle racing
Recurring sporting events disestablished in 2013
2013 disestablishments in Germany
Defunct cycling races in Germany